The Ford Rheinland is an automobile that was built by Ford Germany that was in production from 1933 to 1936.

The name comes from the German region of the Rhineland. In total 5575 of them were made. The engine, taken from Model B, was a four-cylinder, four-stroke 3285 cc giving 50 hp (37 kW) at 2800 rpm.

This was the last model by Ford of Germany offering the big four-cylinder engine. After 1936, there was only the small Ford Eifel and the big Ford V8.

Rheinland
Cars introduced in 1933
Cars of Germany

de:Ford Rheinland